Morgarten is a band of folk – black metal founded in Neuchâtel, Switzerland in 2005. The band performed in many European countries alongside in particular Finntroll, Wind Rose and Slechtvalk.

Biography 
The group's name comes from the legendary Battle of Morgarten, which took place on 15 November south of Zurich. There, a few Swiss Confederates pushed back the Duke Leopold  of Austria, Lord of Habsburg. The themes of their songs are mainly taken from Swiss history and heroic fantasy.
They released their first self-produced album, "Risen to Fight", in 2015. Their second album, "Cry of the Lost", released in 2021, is distributed by "Inner Wound Recordings". It is freely inspired by the story of Arnold von Winkelried. The group's keyboardist, Maël Porret, is also Swiss champion of acrobatic paragliding solo in 2020.

Members 
 Pierric Weber: Vocals and Guitar
 Ilann Porret: Guitar and Vocals
 Cédric Volet: Bass guitar and Backing vocals
 Maël Porret: Keyboard
 Joël Volet: Drums

Discography 
 Risen to Fight (2016)
 Cry of the Lost (2021)

Videography

Clips 
 Wind from the Forest
 To Victory

Lyric videos 
 Tales of My Lands
 The Last Breath

Notes and references

External links 
 
 

Swiss folk metal musical groups
Swiss black metal musical groups
Viking metal musical groups
Swiss Christian metal musical groups
Christian extreme metal groups
Musical groups established in 2005